Tiwian Kendley (born March 26, 1995) is an American professional basketball player who last played for the Wisconsin Herd of the NBA G League. He played college basketball for Morgan State.

College career
Kendley played two seasons at Lamar Community College before transferring to Morgan State. He missed seven games due to injury as a junior. As a junior, Kendley was named to the First Team All-MEAC. He averaged 21 points per game. Kendley was suspended the first 10 games of his senior season due to violating team rules. In his first game back on December 22, 2017, Kendley scored 31 points against George Mason. He scored a career-high 41 points to go with six rebounds, five assists and two steals against Bethune–Cookman on February 19, 2018. Kendley was twice named MEAC Player of the Week and was named to the All-Tournament Team as a senior. He averaged 26.1 points, 4.0 rebounds and 2.1 steals per game. In 44 games, he finished with 1,032 career points.

Professional career
After going undrafted in the 2018 NBA draft, Kendley signed with the Washington Wizards for NBA Summer League. He averaged 9.0 points, 2.5 rebounds, 2.0 steals and 2.0 assists per game. In September 2018 he signed an Exhibit 10 deal with the Wizards. Kendley was waived by the Wizards on October 14. He was then added to the training camp roster of the Wizards’ NBA G League affiliate, the Capital City Go-Go.

On February 21, 2019, Kendley was traded along with 2019 fourth-round pick to the Windy City Bulls for Dikembe Dixson and a 2019 third-round pick.

In March 2020, Kendley joined Gigantes de Jalisco of the Mexican CIBACOPA. In two games, he averaged 21.5 points, 4.5 rebounds, 1.5 assists and 1.5 steals per game.

On February 22, 2021, Kendley signed with KB Vëllaznimi of the Kosovo Basketball Superleague.

On October 23, 2021, Kendley signed with the South Bay Lakers as a free agent. However, he was waived on January 31, 2022.

Kendley then signed with the Wisconsin Herd, making his debut for the team on February 3, 2022 against the Lakeland Magic.

References

External links
Morgan State Bears bio

1995 births
Living people
American men's basketball players
American expatriate basketball people in Kosovo
American expatriate basketball people in Mexico
Basketball players from New York City
Capital City Go-Go players
Junior college men's basketball players in the United States
Lamar Community College alumni
Morgan State Bears men's basketball players
People from Harlem
Shooting guards
Small forwards
South Bay Lakers players
Sportspeople from Manhattan
Windy City Bulls players
Wisconsin Herd players